Gåva till dig is a studio album by CC & Lee, released on 25 February 2009.

Track listing

Chart positions

References

2009 albums
CC & Lee albums